Software lobbying groups lobby governments and advocate generally to influence technology policy decisions on behalf of their members.

 Free Software Foundation
 Campaign for Creativity
 Association for Competitive Technology
 European Information & Communications Technology Industry Association (EICTA), now DigitalEurope
 Business Software Alliance
 Initiative for Software Choice
 Computing Technology Industry Association (CompTIA)
 Information Technology Industry Council (ITI)

Information technology lobbying organizations